Sharpe's Enemy is a British television drama, the fourth of a series that follows the career of Richard Sharpe, a British soldier during the Napoleonic Wars. This episode is based on the 1984 novel of the same name by Bernard Cornwell.

Plot

In 1813, a band of deserters, British, French, and others, led by Sharpe's nemesis Obadiah Hakeswill and French renegade Pot-au-Feu, takes over a Portuguese village. Lady Isabella, the wife of Sir Augustus Farthingdale, the English military envoy to Portugal, is taken captive. The brigands demand a ransom for her and for another lady taken earlier, Sarah, the spouse of French Colonel Dubreton.

Sharpe delivers the money for Lady Isabella, while Dubreton does the same for his wife. Sarah mysteriously recites a verse of poetry. Hakeswill, however, demands double the amount and gives each man five days to deliver the second installment. When Sharpe returns to camp, Wellington, the British commander, decides that drastic action is required to discourage desertion before it can infect his army.

Sharpe also reports seeing a Major Ducos, who accompanied Dubreton. This worries Major Nairn, the head of Wellington's military intelligence. He suspects that Ducos, his French counterpart, is scouting the route for a French invasion of Portugal. The village happens to be directly in the most likely path.

Sarah's poem conceals a clue to the captives' whereabouts. Sharpe comes up with a risky plan to rescue the women. When Farthingdale objects by quoting regulations that a major must lead a detachment of this size, Wellington presents him with a letter from the Prince Regent, who has followed Sharpe's exploits with admiration, promoting Sharpe to major.

Sharpe sneaks into the village with Sergeant Harper and his "chosen men" on Christmas Eve, when the enemy is drunk and distracted, and frees the captives. While they wait for Captain William Frederickson to bring up his company, it is revealed that Lady Isabella had been a prostitute and Sharpe's lover. With time on their hands, they resume their sexual relationship.

The battle goes almost as planned. The deserters are killed or captured, except for Hakeswill, who escapes. He runs into Sharpe's wife Teresa, who had been scouting the approaching French force. Hakeswill mortally wounds her, but is caught by Dubreton, who hands him over to Sharpe. Teresa dies in Sharpe's arms.

Ducos delivers an ultimatum, demanding the surrender of the village. Sharpe refuses. When Farthingdale tries to negotiate, Sharpe stops him by threatening to reveal Isabella's past to the Lisbon court. The French attack, outnumbering the British 10 to 1, but fall into Sharpe's trap and are repulsed with rocket artillery. Hakeswill is executed by firing squad.

Cast
 Sean Bean as Richard Sharpe
 Daragh O'Malley as Sergeant Patrick Harper
 Hugh Fraser as Lord Wellington
 Michael Byrne as Major Nairn
 Pete Postlethwaite as Sergeant Obadiah Hakeswill 
 Assumpta Serna as Comandante Teresa Moreno
 Jeremy Child as Sir Augustus Farthingdale 
 Elizabeth Hurley as Isabella, Lady Farthingdale 
 Helena Michell as Sarah Dubreton 
 Tony Haygarth as Pot-au-Feu 
 Michael Mears as Rifleman Francis Cooper
 John Tams as Rifleman Daniel Hagman
 Jason Salkey as Rifleman Harris
 Lyndon Davies as Rifleman Perkins
 Philip Whitchurch as Captain William Frederickson 
 Féodor Atkine as Major Pierre Ducos 
 François Guétary as Colonel Dubreton 
 Nicholas Rowe as Lieutenant Gilliand 
 Vincent Grass as General Chaumier 
 Diana Perez as Ramona 
 Morgan Jones as Kelly
 Iain Glass as Sergeant Rossner

Production notes
The programme was filmed in Ukraine.

Soundtrack
 "Spanish Ladies"

References

External links
 
 Sharpe's Enemy at SharpeFilm.com

1994 British television episodes
1990s historical films
1990s war films
Films based on British novels
Films based on historical novels
Films based on military novels
Napoleonic Wars films
Enemy
War television films
Fiction set in 1813
Films directed by Tom Clegg (director)